The Italian Football Hall of Fame is the hall of fame for association football players that have had a significant impact on Italian football.

It is housed at the Museo del Calcio in Coverciano, Italy.

History and regulations
The Hall of Fame was established by the Italian Football Federation (FIGC) and Football Museum Foundation in 2011 to celebrate football personalities that "had an unforgettable impact on the history of Italian football". It aims to promote the heritage, history, culture and values of Italian football. 

Since 2011, new members are added every year and are divided into categories: Italian player (retired for at least two seasons), Italian coach (with at least 15 years of activity), Italian veteran (retired for at least 25 years), Foreign player (retired for at least two seasons and that has played in Italy for at least five seasons), Italian referee (retired for at least two seasons), Italian director (with at least 15 years of activity), and Posthumous honours.

The jury listed in the Italian Football Federation website is composed of the directors of the main Italian sporting press bodies, including: Luigi Ferrajolo (President of Italian Sports Press Association), Andrea Monti (La Gazzetta dello Sport), Alessandro Vocalelli (Corriere dello Sport – Stadio and Guerin Sportivo), Paolo De Paola (Tuttosport), Gabriele Romagnoli (Rai Sport), Federico Ferri (Sky Sport), Matteo Marani (Sky Sport 24), Alberto Brandi (Sport Mediaset), and Piercarlo Presutti (Agenzia Nazionale Stampa Associata). However, a different jury composition has been used in different editions.

In 2014, the category Female Italian player was added. In 2018, the Fair Play Award category was added in honour of the late Italian footballer Davide Astori. The same year, a Special Award was awarded to Gianni Brera.

List of inductees

Italian player

Italian coach

Italian veteran

Italian referee

Italian director

Foreign player

Female Italian player

Posthumous awards

Other awards

Davide Astori Fair Play Award

Special Award

References

External links 

Official website

Hall
Association football museums and halls of fame
Museums in Florence
Halls of fame in Italy
2011 establishments in Italy
Awards established in 2011